Elizabeth Gilels (born Yelizaveta Grigoryevna Gilels; ; 30th September 1919 – 13 March 2008) was a Soviet violinist and professor.

Biography 
Elizabeth Gilels was born on the 30th of September 1919 in Odessa into a Jewish family. Her father, Grigory Gilels, was a clerk at a sugar refinery, and her mother, Gesya Gilels, was a housewife. Gilels had multiple siblings, including children from previous marriages, by both of her parents. Despite not being directly connected to the music scene, the family would include two musicians: Emil Gilels and Elizabeth.

"There was a grand piano, and already at the age of two, little Emil showed interest in it touching keys and listening to them." Consequently, Elizabeth was surrounded by music at an early age.

Elizabeth commenced her violin studies with pedagogue Pyotr Stolyarsky, whose pupils included David Oistrakh, Nathan Milstein, and Boris Goldstein. Later she studied with Abram Yampolsky (1890–1956) in Moscow. Early on in her career, she formed a duo with her brother.

In 1937, she became a prize winner of the Eugène Ysaÿe competition (later becoming the Queen Elizabeth Competition) in Brussels. Top prizes were garnered by Stolyarsky's other students, including David Oistrakh, Boris Goldshtein (Goldstein), Yelizaveta (Elizabeth) Gilels, and Mikhail Fikhtengoltz.

After WWII, she formed a duo with Leonid Kogan – Their performance of Bach's Double Concerto was quite successful. They also performed other pieces, such as the sonata by Weinberg.

Beginning in 1966, Elizabeth Gilels taught at the Moscow Conservatory, where she earned the title of professor in 1987. She published a study book on Scales & Double stops for the violin.

Outside of the USSR, she was mostly known in a dual role. First, as the wife of Leonid Kogan and, second, as the sister of the eminent Emil Gilels.

She died in Moscow on 13 March 2008, at the age of 88.

References 

Elena Fedorovich, Ekaterinburg, 2007
Leonid Kogan Bibliography – M. Zazovsky, L. K. (Moscow, 1956).
"Leonid Borisovich Kogan." BAKER'S BIOGRAPHICAL DICTIONARY OF MUSICIANS,  Centennial Edition. Nicolas Slonimsky, Editor Emeritus. Schirmer, 2001.
Emil Gilels in Memoriam
Roth, Henry (1997). Violin Virtuosos: From Paganini to the 21st Century. Los Angeles, CA: California Classics Books. 
В сб.: Музыкальное исполнительство, в. 6, М., 1970, с. 162—193;  - Гринберг М., Пронин В., В классе П. С. Столярского
«Советская музыка», 1972, № 3. - Ойстрах Д., Фурер С., Мордкович Л., О нашем учителе. (К столетию П. С. Столярского)
 Emil Gilels – A Portrait (Biography) by Prof. Dr. Elena Federovitch Ekaterinburg, 2007

External links 
International Eugène Ysaÿe Competition now known as Queen Elisabeth Competition

Elizabeth Gilels CD

1919 births
2008 deaths
Musicians from Odesa
Odesa Jews
Soviet classical violinists
20th-century classical violinists
Women classical violinists
20th-century women musicians
Prize-winners of the Queen Elisabeth Competition